Duncan Fernie (born 1 April 1978) is a Scottish curler from Blair Atholl. He competed at the 2015 Ford World Men's Curling Championship in Halifax, Nova Scotia, Canada, as vice-skip for the Scottish national curling team. He also competed at the 2011 World Championship, where the Scottish team won silver medals.

References

External links
 

1978 births
Living people
Scottish male curlers
Scottish curling champions
Sportspeople from Perth and Kinross